Papà ti ricordo (Dad, I remember you) is a 1952 Italian melodrama film directed by Mario Volpe.

Cast
Paolo Carlini as Andrea
Lea Padovani as Maria
Ludmilla Dudarova as Daria
Irene Genna as Marcellina
Luigi Tosi		
Aldo Silvani
Umberto Spadaro 		
Nino Pavese 		
Erno Crisa		
Pina Piovani 
Doris Duranti

External links
 

1952 films
1950s Italian-language films
Films directed by Mario Volpe
1952 drama films
Italian drama films
Melodrama films
Italian black-and-white films
1950s Italian films